Vicente Lenílson de Lima (born June 4, 1977) is a Brazilian sprinter specializing in the 100 metres, 200 metres, and the 4×100 metres relay.

De Lima represented Brazil at the 2000 Summer Olympics in Sydney. The 37.90 seconds were not enough to beat the 37.61 seconds of the United States, but De Lima, Edson Ribeiro, André da Silva and Claudinei da Silva managed to finish before the Cuban team who timed 38.04 seconds. At the 2003 World Championships he and his teammates won the silver medal at the 4x100 metres relay. At the 2008 Summer Olympics in Beijing he competed at the 100 metres sprint and placed 3rd in his heat, just 0.06 after Usain Bolt and 0.02 after Daniel Bailey in a time of 10.26 seconds. He qualified for the second round in which he ran slower with 10.31, resulting in a sixth place and elimination for the semi finals. Together with José Carlos Moreira, Sandro Viana and Bruno de Barros he also competed at the 4x100 metres relay. In their qualification heat they placed fourth behind Trinidad and Tobago, Japan and the Netherlands. Their time of 39.01 was the seventh out of sixteen participating nations in the first round and they qualified for the final. There they sprinted to a time of 38.24 seconds, the fourth time after the Jamaican, Trinidad and Japanese teams.

De Silva would retroactively be awarded the bronze medal for the 4 × 100 metres relay at the 2008 Summer Olympics following the demotion of the Jamaican team in 2017 for Nesta Carter's failed anti-doping test.

Personal bests
100 m: 10.13 s (wind: +0.7 m/s) –  São Paulo, 6 June 2004
100 m: 10.08 s (wind: +3.0 m/s) –  Ciudad de Guatemala, 11 May 2002
200 m: 20.39 s (wind: -1.0 m/s) –  Belém, 23 May 2004
: 37.90 s –  Sydney, 30 Sep 2000

Achievements

References

External links

Tilastopaja biography

1977 births
Living people
Brazilian male sprinters
Athletes (track and field) at the 2000 Summer Olympics
Athletes (track and field) at the 2004 Summer Olympics
Athletes (track and field) at the 2008 Summer Olympics
Athletes (track and field) at the 2003 Pan American Games
Athletes (track and field) at the 2007 Pan American Games
Olympic athletes of Brazil
Pan American Games athletes for Brazil
Olympic silver medalists for Brazil
Pan American Games medalists in athletics (track and field)
World Athletics Championships medalists
Pan American Games gold medalists for Brazil
Medalists at the 2000 Summer Olympics
Olympic silver medalists in athletics (track and field)
Olympic bronze medalists for Brazil
Medalists at the 2003 Pan American Games
Sportspeople from Rio Grande do Norte
21st-century Brazilian people